is a professional footballer who plays as a right back for Eredivisie club Cambuur. Born in the Netherlands, he is a former youth international for Japan.

Club career

Early career 
Van Wermeskerken was born in Maastricht, Netherlands, to a Dutch father and a Japanese mother. When Sai was only 2-years old, his family moved to Japan after his father had got a job there. The van Wermeskerken family settled down in Yamanashi Prefecture. Van Wermeskerken started his career at Yatsugatake Hokuto at age eight, before joining Ventforet Kofu youth academy in 2008.

Dordrecht 
After several years in the Kofu youth system, van Wermeskerken was rewarded with a contract by Dordrecht in July 2013. He made his first appearance for Dordrecht on 10 May 2015, in the Eredivisie match against Twente.

SC Cambuur 
On 21 August 2017, van Wermeskerken signed for SC Cambuur.

PEC Zwolle 
On 9 July 2019, van Wermeskerken signed a two-year deal for Eredivisie side PEC Zwolle on a free transfer.

Return to Cambuur 
On 10 August 2022, van Wermeskerken returned to Cambuur for one season.

International career
On 14 March 2016, Sai received his first call-up to the Japan national under-23 football team for the friendly match against Mexico.

References

External links
 Sai van Wermeskerken official Instagram

 
 Sai van Wermeskerken profile at Japan Football Association

1994 births
Living people
Citizens of Japan through descent
Japanese footballers
Association football fullbacks
Japan youth international footballers
Japanese people of Dutch descent
Footballers from Maastricht
Dutch footballers
FC Dordrecht players
SC Cambuur players
PEC Zwolle players
Eredivisie players
Eerste Divisie players
Dutch people of Japanese descent
Sportspeople of Japanese descent